Paul Wever (born 28 January 1893 in Langenberg near Wörth am Rhein; died 11 August 1944 in Aix-en-Provence) was a German naval officer, Vizeadmiral of the Kriegsmarine during World War II. Paul Wever belonged to the generation of men who were sent to war, twice. Between 1 January 1940 to 21 June 1940 was director of the Department of Navy Message Evaluation, later called (3/SKL) Naval Operations of the  Naval War Command. The unit was specifically concerned with Naval Intelligence.

Military career

World War I
Wever joined on 1 April 1912 as a Cadet in the Imperial German Navy in the 1912 crew year. He took part in basic training on the protected cruiser, then being used as a training ship , graduating on 11 March 1913. On 12 April 1913, he was appointed Fähnrich zur See (Ensign at sea). From 1 April 1914, he attended further training at the Naval Academy at Flensburg-Mürwik and attended special courses in artillery, infantry and torpedo training. The training courses had to be canceled due to the outbreak of World War I in July 1914. Wever served on the light cruiser  from 2 August 1914. On 25 March 1915 he was promoted to Leutnant zur See (Lieutenant at Sea). Wever was then transferred on 16 December 1916 to the light cruiser , which was still under construction at the time. In September 1917 he attended the U-boat training school in Neustadt in Holstein, before he was transferred in December 1917 as officer on the submarine . He was promoted to Oberleutnant on 25 December 1917. Wever remained in the position until October 1918. Then he served as an instructor for anti-submarine patrols on the auxiliary ship .

Reichsmarine
Wever remained aboard Meteor until December 1918. From 3 June 1920 to 31 March 1922, he was then used as a flag lieutenant on the staff of the commander of the Baltic Sea forces. In this service, he was promoted to lieutenant commander on 1 September 1922. He then served until 22 December 1923 as a torpedo officer on the light cruiser  and was then until 5 October 1927 adjutant at the Torpedo and mine Inspectorate in Kiel. This was followed by the Admiralstabsbildung until 23 March 1929. Subsequently, Wever was briefly put at the disposal of the chief of the Marinestation der Ostsee (Baltic Sea Naval Station). From 17 April 1929, he then served as a navigational officer on the light cruiser  and was promoted in this position on 1 October 1930 to Korvettenkapitän. On 28 October 1930, Wever then became head of the naval division of the Marines and then from 17 January 1933 Naval attaché at the German embassies in Paris and Madrid. On 1 January 1936, the promotion to the frigate captain. Then Wever served as First Officer on the heavy cruiser  and was appointed at this time on 1 April 1937 Captain at sea. From 31 May 1937, he then served as director of the Inspectorate of the torpedo and mining between 19 July and 17 August 1937 also deputy inspector of the Inspectorate of Education.

Kriegsmarine
From 15 June 1938 Wever then took over the light cruiser  as commander and was then from 6 May 1939 at the disposal of the Commanding Admiral of the Naval Station of the North Sea. Then from 23 August – 4 December 1939, he led the staff of the Marine Group Command West. He was then from 1 January – 21 June 1940 as chief of the department of Naval Intelligence(3/SKL) (German Naval Intelligence Service) in the High Command of the Kriegsmarine and from 22 June 1940 to 15 January 1943 Naval Chief of the German Armistice Commission for France in Wiesbaden. On 1 September 1941, he was promoted to rear admiral. From 16 January, Wever was made available to the Commander of the Marine Group West and finally appointed on 2 September 1943 the Commanding Admiral of the French South Coast. In this position was on 1 October 1943 nor the promotion to vice admiral. On 11 August 1944 Wever died of a heart attack.

References

1893 births
1944 deaths
Imperial German Navy personnel of World War I
Reichsmarine personnel
Vice admirals of the Kriegsmarine